Ernest Clark (12 February 1912 – 11 November 1994) was a British actor of stage, television and film.

Early life
Clark was the son of a master builder in Maida Vale, and was educated nearby at St Marylebone Grammar School. After leaving school he became a reporter on a local newspaper in Croydon. He had always wanted to be an actor and when offered a job with the local rep, he took it and apart from six years in the army during World War II, he remained in the profession.

Career
His first stage appearance was at the Festival Theatre, Cambridge in 1937, and he went on to appear in plays at both the West End in London, and Broadway in New York.

In 1955 he appeared on stage in Witness for the Prosecution at Henry Miller's Theatre in New York City, and on film as Air Vice-Marshal The Honourable Ralph Cochrane AFC RAF, AOC, No. 5 Group RAF in The Dam Busters (1955).

He is perhaps best remembered for his role as the irascible Professor Geoffrey Loftus in the television comedy series Doctor in the House and its sequels, apart from Doctor at Sea, in which he appeared as Captain Norman Loftus (the brother of Professor Loftus). He also appeared as the Dean in the BBC sitcom All Gas and Gaiters (1967–71).

Clark was president of the actors' trade union Equity from 1969 to 1973.

Personal life
He married three times: one of his wives was actress Avril Hillyer, the first two marriages were dissolved. His third marriage, from 1972 until his death, was to Julia Lockwood (née Margaret Julia Leon in 1941), the actress daughter of the British film star Margaret Lockwood, with whom he had four children, Timothy, Nicholas, Lucy and Katharine.
He died 11 November 1994 in Hinton St. George, Somerset, aged 82.

Filmography

 Private Angelo – (uncredited)
 Obsession – (uncredited)
 Seven Days to Noon (1950) – Barber (uncredited)
 The Mudlark (1950) – Hammond (uncredited)
 The Long Memory (1952) – Prosecuting Counsel (uncredited)
 Doctor in the House (1954) – Dr. Parrish
 Father Brown (1954) – Bishop's Secretary
 Beau Brummell (1954) – Dr. Warren
 The Dam Busters (1955) – Air Vice-Marshall Ralph Cochrane. AOC, No.5 Group RAF
 1984 (1956) – Outer Party Announcer
 Reach for the Sky (1956) – Wing Commander Beiseigel
 The Baby and the Battleship (1956) – Cmdr. Geoffrey Digby
 Stars in Your Eyes (1956) – Ronnie
 The Man in the Sky (1957) – Maine
 Time Without Pity (1957) – Under Secretary – Home Office
 The Birthday Present (1958) – Barrister
 A Tale of Two Cities (1958) – Stryver
 I Accuse! (1958) – Prosecutor – 1st Dreyfus trial
 The Safecracker (1958) – Major Adbury
 A Woman of Mystery (1958) – Harvey
 Blind Spot (1958) – F. G. Fielding
 A Touch of Larceny (1959) – Cmdr. Bates
 Sink the Bismarck! (1960) – Captain (Suffolk)
 No Love for Johnnie (1961) – M.P. (uncredited)
 Three on a Spree (1961) – Col. Drew
 Partners in Crime (1961) – Ashton
 Edgar Wallace Mysteries (Time to Remember) episode (1962) – Cracknell
 The Wild and the Willing (1962) – Vice Chancellor
 Tomorrow at Ten (1962) – Dr. Towers
 Master Spy (1963) – Doctor Pembury
 Billy Liar (1963) – Prison Governor
 Ladies Who Do (1963) – Stockbroker
 A Stitch in Time (1963) – Prof. Crankshaw
 Nothing But the Best (1964) – Roberts
 The Devil-Ship Pirates (1964) – Sir Basil Smeeton
 Boy with a Flute (1964) Short)
 Masquerade (1965) – Minister
 The Secret of My Success (1965) – Earl of Aldershot's solicitor 
 Arabesque (1966) – Beauchamp
 Finders Keepers (1966) – Air Marshall
 It! (1967) – Harold Grove
 Cuckoo Patrol (1967) – Marshall
 Attack on the Iron Coast (1968) – Air Vice Marshall Woodbridge
 Salt and Pepper (1968) – Col. Balson
 Castle Keep (1969) – British Colonel (uncredited)
 The Executioner (1970) – Roper
 Song of Norway (1970) – Councilman
 Gandhi (1982) – Lord Hunter
 Memed, My Hawk (1984) – Father
 The Pope Must Die (1991) – Abbot

External links

References

1912 births
1994 deaths
English male film actors
English male stage actors
English male television actors
People from Maida Vale
Male actors from London
People educated at St Marylebone Grammar School
British Army personnel of World War II
20th-century English male actors